Nicolás Arsel (born 9 May 1982) is an Argentine alpine skier. He competed in three events at the 2002 Winter Olympics.

References

1982 births
Living people
Argentine male alpine skiers
Olympic alpine skiers of Argentina
Alpine skiers at the 2002 Winter Olympics
People from Río Negro Province